Aboubakar Koné may refer to:

 Aboubakar Koné (footballer, born 1982), Ivorian football striker
 Aboubakar Koné (footballer, born 1990), French football forward

See also
 Aboubacar Kone (born  2001), Ivorian-born Belgian football defender